Céline Devaux (born in 1987) is a French director and illustrator . In September 2017,  at the Venice Film Festival, her film Gros Chagrin was awarded the prize for best short film.

Career 
She studied at the École nationale supérieure des arts décoratifs (ENSAD) in animation cinema.

In 2013, for her graduation project, she directed the short film  Vie et Mort de l’Illustre Grigori Efimovitch Raspoutine, which won awards at several festivals, including the Clermont-Ferrand International Short Film Festival (Best Film Award). Animation francophone) and the Festival Premiers Plans in Angers. 

Her second short film, Le Repas Dominical, with the voice of Vincent Macaigne and music by Flavien Berger, was selected for official competition at Cannes, and won the 2016 César Award for Best Animated Short Film. 

In September 2017, her film Gros Chagrin was awarded the prize for best short film at the Venice Film Festival. In 2018, her work was presented during an exhibition called "Repas Chagrin" at Maison Fumetti, a cultural place in Nantes dedicated to comics and graphic arts. In 2018, she was part of the jury of the Festival Premiers Plans d'Angers in the category of short films.

She is a member of the 50/50 collective, which aims to promote gender equality and diversity in cinema and audiovisual.

Her first feature film, Everyone Loves Jeanne, was selected for a special screening at the 2022 International Critics' Week.

Filmography 

 2010 : How to Make a Hysterically Funny Video on a Very Sad Music
 2011 : How to Make a Movie for an Abbey
 2012 : Vie et Mort de l'illustre Grigori Efimovitch Raspoutine (animated short)
 2013 : L'Onde nue
 2015 : Gravité de Flavien Berger (clip)
 2015 : Le Repas dominical (animated short)
 2017 : Gros Chagrin (animated short)
 2022 : Tout le monde aime Jeanne (feature)

References 

1987 births
French animated film directors
Living people